Kamiah Smalls (born April 17, 1998) is an American basketball player. She was drafted by the Indiana Fever with the 28th overall pick of the 2020 WNBA draft.

WNBA career

Indiana Fever 
Smalls was drafted by the Indiana Fever in the third round (28th overall) of the 2020 WNBA draft. She was cut by the Fever on May 19, 2020, but was brought back to the team after Erica Wheeler was ruled out due to a positive COVID-19 test. In her debut against the Chicago Sky on August 31, 2020, she came off the bench and scored 13 on a perfect 4-for-4 shooting, including 3-for-3 from 3-point range. Smalls became the fourth player in Fever history to score at least 13 points in her debut.

Connecticut Sun 
Smalls signed a training camp deal with the Connecticut Sun on February 1, 2021. She was waived by the Sun on May 12, 2021, after failing to make the final roster.

Minnesota Lynx
Smalls signed a hardship contract with the Lynx on June 1, 2022. She appeared for Minnesota that day in their game against the Atlanta Dream off the bench. Smalls appeared in 3 games for the Lynx before being released from her hardship contract.

Overseas career 
After getting cut by the Fever, Smalls signed with USE Scotti Rosa Empoli of Lega Basket Femminile.

Career statistics

College 

|-
| style="text-align:left;" | 2016–17
| style="text-align:left;" | James Madison
| 33 || 29 || 27.5 || .507 || .308 || .753 || 5.5 || 1.7 || 1.0 || 0.2 || 2.1 || 9.8
|-
| style="text-align:left;" | 2017–18
| style="text-align:left;" | James Madison
| 34 || 34 || 31.7 || .401 || .283 || .729 || 6.1 || 2.6 || 1.6 || 0.4 || 3.5 || 15.0
|-
| style="text-align:left;" | 2018–19
| style="text-align:left;" | James Madison
| 34 || 33 || 29.1 || .461 || .380 || .827 || 5.2 || 2.6 || 1.6 || 0.3 || 3.2 || 15.6
|-
| style="text-align:left;" | 2019–20
| style="text-align:left;" | James Madison
| 29 || 29 || 30.5 || .471 || .380 || .874 || 5.3 || 2.9 || 1.4 || 0.3 || 3.7 || 18.6
|-
| style="text-align:center;" colspan=2 | Career
| 130 || 125 || 29.7 || .452 || .343 || .802 || 5.5 || 2.4 || 1.2 || 0.3 || 3.1 || 14.5

WNBA 

|-
| align="left" | 2020
| align="left" | Indiana
| 7 || 0 || 14.3 || .450 || .583 || 1.000 || 1.1 || 2.0 || 0.1 || 0.1 || 0.3 || 3.9
|-
| align="left" | 2022
| align="left" | Minnesota
| 3 || 0 || 11.3 || .250 || .000 || .000 || 1.7 || 2.0 || 1.3 || 0.0 || 1.3 || 1.3
|-
| style="text-align:left;" | Career
| style="text-align:left;" | 1 year, 1 team
| 10 || 0 || 13.4 || .393 || .438 || 1.000 || 1.3 || 2.0 || 0.5 || 0.1 || 0.6 || 3.1

References

External links 
 
 James Madison Dukes profile

1998 births
Living people
Basketball players from Philadelphia
Guards (basketball)
James Madison Dukes women's basketball players
Indiana Fever draft picks
Indiana Fever players
American expatriate basketball people in Italy
Minnesota Lynx players